Mahonia sheridaniana is a shrub in the Berberidaceae described as a species in 1913. It is endemic to China, found in the provinces of Hubei and Sichuan.

The species is named in honor of "Dr. W.R. Sheridan, formerly of the American Methodist Mission Hospital in Chengtu" (Chengdu, 成都市) This is most likely an error for Dr. W.J. Sheridan, of the Canadian Methodist Mission Hospital in Chengtu.

References

External links

sheridaniana
Plants described in 1913
Endemic flora of China